Young-chul, also spelled as Yeong-cheol, or in North Korea as Yong-chol, is a Korean masculine given name. The meaning differs based on the hanja used to write each syllable of the name. There are 34 hanja with the reading "young" and 11 hanja with the reading "chul" on the South Korean government's official list of hanja which may be used in given names. According to South Korean government data, it was the eighth-most popular name for baby boys born in 1940, rising to fourth place by 1950.

People
People with this name include:

Sportspeople
Park Young-chul (born 1954), South Korean judoka
Cha Young-chul (born 1959), South Korean sport shooter
Lim Young-chul (born 1960), South Korean handball coach
Jang Yeong-cheol (born 1964), South Korean sprint canoer
Shin Young-chul (born 1964), South Korean volleyball player
Park Yeong-cheol (born 1969), South Korean swimmer
Kim Young-chul (footballer) (born 1976), South Korean football defender (K3 League)
Back Young-chul (born 1978), South Korean football midfielder
Shin Young-chol (born 1986), South Korean football midfielder (Thai Premier League)
Cui Yongzhe (Korean name Choe Yeong-cheol, born 1987), Chinese football midfielder of Korean descent
Jo Yong-chol (born 1987), North Korean sport shooter
Ri Yong-chol (born 1991), North Korean football defender

Entertainers
Kim Yeong-cheol (actor) (born 1953), South Korean actor
Kim Young-chul (comedian) (born 1974), South Korean comedian
Jang Young-chul (fl. 1994–present), South Korean television screenwriter

Other
Kim Yong-chol (born 1946), North Korean general
Hyon Yong-chol (1949–2015), North Korean general
Yoo Young-chul (born 1970), South Korean serial killer who served as basis for the film The Chaser

See also
List of Korean given names

References

Korean masculine given names